Rosenbergia lepesmei is a species of beetle in the family Cerambycidae. It was described by Gilmour in 1960.

References

Batocerini
Beetles described in 1960